{{Infobox government cabinet
|incumbent = January–November 1924
|image = Ramsay MacDonald ggbain.37952.jpg
|date_formed = 
|date_dissolved = 
|government_head_title = Prime Minister
|government_head = Ramsay MacDonald
|state_head_title = Monarch
|state_head = George V
|deputy_government_head  = 
|former_members_number =
|total_number = 58 appointments
|political_party = Labour Party
|legislature_status = 
|legislature_term = {{Longitem|33rd UK Parliament{{midsize|lost a vote of confidence}}}}
|budget =
|election = 1923 general election
|last_election = 1924 general election
|opposition_party = Conservative Party
|opposition_leaders = 
|previous = First Baldwin ministry
|successor = Second Baldwin ministry
}}
The first MacDonald ministry of the United Kingdom lasted from January to November 1924. The Labour Party, under Ramsay MacDonald, had failed to win the general election of December 1923, with 191 seats, although the combined Opposition tally exceeded that of the Conservative government, creating a hung parliament. Stanley Baldwin remained in office until January 1924.

The Conservatives had won the previous general election held in 1922 shortly after the fall of the Lloyd George Coalition when along with their Unionist allies, they had won 344 seats. This seemed a significant enough majority to expect a full parliamentary term. Nevertheless, shortly after the election the Conservative leader Bonar Law died and was replaced by Baldwin, who reneged on his predecessor's electoral pledge not to introduce protective tariffs. Baldwin sought a fresh mandate from the electorate in 1923. The result was decisive, being against protectionism, and it was clear that the Conservatives had lost, despite remaining the largest party. Baldwin had little chance of remaining prime minister when the balance of power was held by the Liberal Party under H. H. Asquith, who had campaigned vigorously for free trade, to the point of healing the rift that existed between the Asquith and Lloyd George Liberal Party factions. Baldwin advised King George V to send for MacDonald, since the Labour Party held more seats in the Commons than the Liberals. MacDonald accepted the King's commission later that day, arriving with his Labour colleagues, to the amusement of many and dismay of others, in full court dress.

MacDonald and the cabinet
MacDonald had become Labour's first proper leader in 1922. As well as being Prime Minister, he became his own Foreign Secretary, a dual role which he performed well enough, but which alienated the second man in the party, Arthur Henderson, who became Home Secretary. Philip Snowden, the evangelical ex-member of the Independent Labour Party (ILP) became a rigidly orthodox Chancellor of the Exchequer, while the next two prominent members of the party, J. H. Thomas and J. R. Clynes, became Colonial Secretary and Lord Privy Seal respectively.  The Fabian Sidney Webb, who had, along with Henderson, been instrumental in conceiving Labour's 1918 programme 'Labour and the New Social Order' which had committed the party to nationalisation (Clause IV), was appointed President of the Board of Trade; another Fabian, Lord Olivier, became Secretary of State for India. A former chairman of the parliamentary party, Willie Adamson, became Scottish Secretary, while left-wingers Fred Jowett and John Wheatley became, respectively, First Commissioner of Works and Minister of Health.

The Cabinet was characterised by a moderate trade union feel, although it also contained a few Liberals. Only three members had previously been ministers (two only briefly): Richard Haldane, 1st Viscount Haldane (ex-Liberal), Arthur Henderson and J. R. Clynes; though others had been under-secretaries.

Domestic policy
The main achievement of the government was that it showed itself to be 'fit to govern'. Although this might not have meant much in terms of concrete policy-making, it at least did not alarm voters who may have feared that the party would dismantle the country and promulgate 'socialism'; although, in any case, its tenuous parliamentary position would have made radical moves near impossible. Hence, Labour policies such as nationalisation, the 'capital levy' taxation and public works programmes to alleviate unemployment were either played down or ignored altogether. However, to act 'respectably', as any other government would have, was a major component of the MacDonald electoral appeal and strategy. Indeed, some historians have seen, in this time, an electoral consensus that existed between MacDonald and his Conservative counterpart Baldwin, to maintain the stability of the electoral system and preclude any radicalism that might have alienated voters or exacerbated crises such as unemployment. By 1929, voters felt able to trust Labour and thus they were voted back in again.

Despite lacking a parliamentary majority, the First Labour Government was able to introduce a number of measures which made life more tolerable for working people. The main achievement of the government was the 1924 Wheatley Housing Act, which MacDonald dubbed 'our most important legislative item'. This measure went some way towards rectifying the problem of the housing shortage, caused by the disruption of the building trade during the First World War and the inability of working-class tenants to rent decent, affordable housing. Wheatley was able to provide public housing to council tenants, as against the previous government's commitment to privatisation. This landmark Act subsidised the construction of 521,700 rented homes at controlled rents by 1933, when the subsidy for encouraging local authority housing construction was abolished.

Various improvements were also made in benefits for pensioners and the unemployed. More generous provision for the unemployed was provided, with increases in both children's allowances and in unemployment benefits for both men and women. Unemployment benefit payments were increased from 15 shillings (75p) to 18 shillings (90p) a week for men, and from 12 shillings (60p) to 15 shillings (75p) for women, while the children's allowance was doubled to two shillings. The "gap" between periods of benefit under the unemployment insurance scheme was also abolished. In addition, eligibility for benefits was extended,The People's Party: the History of the Labour Party by Tony Wright and Matt Carter while the household means-test for the long-term unemployed was removed, more people were made eligible for unemployment benefits, uncovenanted benefits (beyond those covered by insurance) were made a statutory right, and the duration of unemployment benefits was extended from 26 to 41 weeks. However, a "genuinely seeking work" clause, by which applicants had to prove that they were actively seeking work, was introduced, a move that the government saw as a means of preventing abuse but drew criticism from within the Labour movement.

For pensioners, increases were made in both old-age pensions and the pensions of ex-servicemen and of their widows and children. Improvements were made in the condition of old-age pensioners by allowing small incomes from savings to be disregarded in calculating the pension due. As a result of this change, 60,000 elderly people, whose meagre savings had previously reduced their pension entitlement, received the full state pension. Eligibility for the state pension was also extended so that it covered 70% of the over-seventies, and 150,000 elderly people who had never received a pension before were now entitled to them. In addition, changes were made which allowed for pensions to be transferred to a surviving parent of a dependant who had a pension. An Old Age Pensions Act was also passed, which guaranteed a weekly pension of ten shillings (50p) to people over the age of seventy who earned under 15 shillings (75p) a week.

The government also endeavoured to extend educational opportunities. Local authorities were empowered, where they wished, to raise the school-leaving age to 15, the adult education grant was tripled, maintenance allowances for young people in secondary schools were increased, state scholarships (which had previously been in suspense) were restored, the proportion of free places in secondary schools was increased, approval was given to forty new secondary schools, a survey was carried out to provide for the replacement of as many of the more insanitary or obsolete schools as possible, and forty was set as the maximum class size in elementary school. Restrictions on education spending imposed by the previous government were removed, while local authorities were encouraged to increase the number of free secondary school places. In addition, an Education Act was passed which created an English secondary school system between the ages of 11–14. The restriction on maintenance allowances given by Local Authorities was removed, with the previous rule being that 20% of the expenditure was given as grant by the Board to the Local Authorities, but this was raised to 50%. In addition, restrictions on grants for providing meals for children were removed. Spending on adult education was increased, with the grant-in-aid increased from £20,600 to £30,500 pounds, while a small expansion of central and secondary schools took place.

The Agricultural Wages (Regulation) Act restored minimum wages for agricultural workers. County committees were established with the power to fix wages, together with a central wages board to supervise the county awards. The act helped bring about a substantial improvement over most of the country, with agricultural wages being quickly increased to 30 shillings a week (a higher level in certain counties) under the wage committees. In addition, a Conservative bill "to attenuate the powers of the Trade Boards" was dropped. Cuts in both direct and indirect taxation were also made which were hailed as representing a victory for working people, with the chancellor Philip Snowden describing the programme as representing "the greatest step ever taken towards the Radical idea of the free breakfast table."

Miner's silicosis was included within the provisions for workmen's compensation, under the Workmen's Compensation (Silicosis) Act of 1924 while the London Traffic Act 1924, which provided for the regulation of London traffic, regulated privately owned public transport; setting timetables and safety standards.

A law was introduced which modified the right of a landlord to obtain possession of a house for his own family's use, where unnecessary hardship would be caused to the tenant. The Protection from Eviction Act of 1924 provided some degree of protection to tenants "in the face of landlords seeking vacant possession and rent rises." This legislation protected tenants from eviction by landlords who attempted to obtain "decontrolled" status for their properties to raise rents. In addition, government funds were allocated for the repair and modernisation of 60,000 government built houses.

A subsidy for sugar beet cultivation to support agriculture was introduced,  while schemes for roads and bridges, land reclamation and drainage, and afforestation were developed and extended. Financial support was also provided to municipal works to reduce unemployment. Although relief schemes funded by the chancellor Philip Snowden had little impact on reducing unemployment, the registered rate of unemployment fell from 11.7% in 1923 to 10.3% in 1924.

The restrictions imposed by the previous government on spending by the Poplar Board of Guardians were removed, while the National Health Insurance (Cost of Medical Benefit) Bill revised the capitation fee paid to doctors. Restrictions introduced by the previous Coalition government on state grants to the principal public health grant earning services (including maternity and child welfare, tuberculosis, and venereal disease) were removed. This was followed by a circular issued to local authorities to this effect and enabling them "to carry out more effectively their public health powers under the law." Child welfare and maternity services were extended, while ex-service patients who had been treated as "pauper lunatics" under former Governments were removed from being treated in that way. As a result of this change, they were now paid for out of public funds.

The restrictions which prevented people from other countries, short-time workers, married women, and single persons residing with relatives from claiming uncovenanted benefit were abolished, while the "gaps" of 3 weeks which previous governments had made necessary after 12 weeks’ unemployment pay. In addition, a new Act was passed that extended the benefit period from 26 to 41 weeks. The rate of interest charged under the Agricultural Credits Act of 1923 passed by the previous Conservative government was reduced to 4%, while a 5% reduction on admissions to training colleges (imposed in 1923) was withdrawn. Improvements were also made in the pay of workers in the Army.
 For war pensioners, new pensions were provided "in deserving cases at the rate of over three hundred a week."

Various improvements were also made to public places. A scheme for beautifying St. James’ Park was carried out with a large measure of success, while additional areas of park land was allocated for games in Bushey Park, Richmond Park, and Regent's Park. Lawn-tennis courts were opened in Bushey Park, while two more playgrounds were provided for children in Regent's Park and one in Greenwich Park. F.O. Roberts, the Minister of Pensions, stopped the making of "final awards," by instructing boards that awards should be "given for a year and until further instructions," which meant that every man under such awards had the right of appeal for an increase of pension if he got worse. In addition, pensions could now be transferred to a surviving parent of a dependent who had a pension, while Need Pensions were raised, with the minimum rate increased from 4s.2d. to 5s. a week and the basis for these need pensions increased to 25 shillings (£1.25) a week for one individual and 35 shillings (£1.75) a week for a married couple. The result of this was that every parent or dependent in receipt of a need pension, received an immediate increase of between 2s.6d (12.5p) to 5s (25p) a week.

During its first 6 months in office, the First Labour Government issued a circular that removed restrictions on grants for health services, an action which led to the extension of welfare schemes for childhood and maternity. About 70 new infant welfare centres had been opened, more health visitors had been appointed, many more beds had been provided in homes for mothers and babies, and the milk supply was extended in 16 cases. As a result of the new circular, for TB, about 1,500 new beds had been arranged by the local authorities. In May 1924, a grant of £1 million was made from a Road Fund to assist the rural areas in England and Wales to improve their roads.

The Scottish Office introduced various measures to improve socio-economic conditions in Scotland.  To alleviate unemployment and distress caused in the Outer Hebrides due to a depression in the fishing industry and the failure of crops, the Board inaugurated relief work schemes which had for their object the resurfacing of the roads in the regions affected. Financial assistance was allocated towards the execution of Land Drainage schemes to reduce unemployment in several areas while loans were granted to crofters to enable them to purchase the implements and seeds necessary  for the cultivation of their holdings, and to take over stocks of sheep and other livestock. Wherever the rents of the holdings were considered to be too high they were reduced, a valuation having been undertaken by the Land Court in each case. Several hundreds of additional applicants were settled on the land, with the assistance of the funds of the Scottish Board. Structural additions were carried out at several agricultural colleges, and scholarships enabling them to receive instruction were granted to the sons and daughters of agricultural workers and others.

The Scottish Board of Health also withdrew the restrictions imposed under the previous Conservative government upon the expenditure to be incurred in the public health services, and consequently there were developments affecting port sanitation, Tuberculosis, the welfare of the blind, and maternity and child welfare. The Board also extended grants to local authorities for the purpose of slum clearance, while a limit was placed upon the number of two-apartment houses to be erected as a means of improving housing standards. The provisions under which Poor Law Relief was accorded to able-bodied unemployed and their dependents were extended for a further year, and were improved to permit of parish councils making grants in aid of emigration. A number of schemes for the extension of school premises were put into operation.

Entitlement to sickness allowances to war widows and orphans were extended, a national electrical policy and a national road policy was launched, and two additional treatment centres for those afflicted by venereal diseases were constructed. Various measures were also introduced to improve mine safety, as characterised by the application of new rules, attempts to enforce safety regulations, and the appointment of additional inspectors. The old regulations for working in Quarries and Metalliferous Mines were improved, while a medical man was appointed to inspect the First Aid equipment kept at mines. Higher spending on education and health was carried out, while  sickness grants (which had been abolished under a previous administration) were restored.

According to the Labour Party historian G.D.H. Cole, in summing up the record of the First Labour Government,

What it could do and did achieve was to undo a good many of the administrative effects of the "Geddes Axe," to pass several valuable measures of social reform, and to make a somewhat faint-hearted attempt at coping with the unemployment problem by the institution of public works

Foreign policy
Many historians have argued that the first Labour Government's most notable achievements were in foreign affairs, of which Ramsay MacDonald had devoted much time and effort, having taken the posts of both Prime Minister and Foreign Secretary. Germany had failed to maintain reparation payments in the years following the end of the Great War, and France, in response, occupied Germany's industrial heartland, the Ruhr. The Dawes Conference was subsequently held to find a solution to the crisis, and, in August 1924, it concluded that Germany had to achieve economic stability before paying out any reparations. Although France refused to adopt the Dawes Plan, MacDonald spent most of his time as Foreign Secretary trying to win over the French. Macdonald first held talks with both the Belgians and French at Chequers and then hosted an Inter-Allied conference in London in July 1924.

Through sharp negotiating skills and powers of persuasion, Macdonald was able to successfully make the Prime Minister of France Édouard Herriot agree to all of the proposals in the Dawes Plan, apart from an immediate withdrawal from the Ruhr. That August, fresh agreements on peace and reparations were signed in London between Germany and the Allies. Macdonald's success in helping to resolve international disagreements at this time was arguably one of the first Labour Government's most significant accomplishments.

Fall of the government

What eventually helped to bring down the first Labour government was the fear surrounding the alleged Communist threat. Conservatives were quick to point out any 'Red' (Soviet) influence in Britain, one example being the 'Campbell Case'. The Communist J. R. Campbell had been prosecuted by the government for publishing an article calling on troops not to fire on strikers. When Labour withdrew the prosecution, it was seen by many as a 'Red' influence on the leadership. H. H. Asquith, the Leader of the Liberal Party, called for the appointment of a committee of enquiry, as this would allow Labour time to survive the scandal, but MacDonald would not allow it. He said that if MPs voted in favour of the enquiry, then the government would resign. They consequently voted for the enquiry with a large majority, so MacDonald announced that the Labour government would resign after only nine months in office. Soon after this resignation came the emergence of the Zinoviev letter, which has become part of Labour Party mythology.

The Daily Mail published a letter apparently written by Zinoviev, the head of the Communist International (Comintern), which asked supporters to prepare for imminent revolution. It is now known that the Zinoviev letter was a fake (documents released by the Public Record Office in 1998 finally revealed the letter to have been a forgery), but it scarcely helped Labour during their election campaign. The Liberals were also becoming increasingly restive about continuing to support the government, while MacDonald's inability to delegate tasks to subordinates was also a factor in Labour's demise. He had taken the position of Foreign Secretary as well as Prime Minister and by the end of the nine months it seemed as if MacDonald had wanted to give up power through fatigue. He once wrote in his diary that he worked from '7am to 1 am, with occasional extras'. However, the First Labour Government ultimately showed that Labour was 'fit to govern' and it returned to office five years later.

Cabinet

January 1924 – November 1924
 Ramsay MacDonald – Prime Minister, Foreign Secretary and Leader of the House of Commons
 The Viscount Haldane – Lord High Chancellor of Great Britain and joint Leader of the House of Lords
 The Lord Parmoor – Lord President of the Council and joint Leader of the House of Lords
 John Robert Clynes – Lord Keeper of the Privy Seal and Deputy Leader of the House of Commons
 Philip Snowden – Chancellor of the Exchequer
 Arthur Henderson – Secretary of State for the Home Department
 James Henry Thomas – Secretary of State for the Colonies
 Stephen Walsh – Secretary of State for War
 The Lord Olivier – Secretary of State for India
 William Adamson – Secretary for Scotland
 The Lord Thomson – Secretary for Air
 The Viscount Chelmsford – First Lord of the Admiralty
 Josiah Wedgwood – Chancellor of the Duchy of Lancaster
 Sidney Webb – President of the Board of Trade
 Noel Buxton – Minister of Agriculture
 Charles Philips Trevelyan – President of the Board of Education
 Vernon Hartshorn – Postmaster-General
 Frederick William Jowett – First Commissioner of Works
 Thomas Shaw – Minister of Labour
 John Wheatley – Minister of Health

List of ministers
Members of the Cabinet are in bold face.

Notes

Notes

References
 D. Butler and G. Butler, Twentieth Century British Political Facts 1900–2000'' (Macmillan, 2000)

External links
 Labour's great record: an outline of the first six months' work of the Labour government (Labour Joint Publications Department, 1924)
1924: The First Labour Government - UK Parliament Living Heritage
First Labour Government - 1924 Housing Act - UK Parliament Living Heritage
 Labour and war pensions with an introduction by the rt. hon. F.O. Roberts, J.P., M.P. Minister of Pensions (Joint Labour Publications Department)

British ministries
Government
1924 establishments in the United Kingdom
1924 in British politics
Ministries of George V
1924 disestablishments in the United Kingdom
Ministry 1
Cabinets established in 1924
Cabinets disestablished in 1924
1920s in the United Kingdom
Interwar Britain